Naturally occurring niobium (41Nb) is composed of one stable isotope (93Nb). The most stable radioisotope is 92Nb with a half-life of 34.7 million years. The next longest-lived niobium isotopes are 94Nb (half-life: 20,300 years) and 91Nb with a half-life of 680 years. There is also a meta state of 93Nb at 31 keV whose half-life is 16.13 years. Twenty-seven other radioisotopes have been characterized. Most of these have half-lives that are less than two hours, except 95Nb (35 days), 96Nb (23.4 hours) and 90Nb (14.6 hours). The primary decay mode before stable 93Nb is electron capture and the primary mode after is beta emission with some neutron emission occurring in 104–110Nb.

Only 95Nb (35 days) and 97Nb (72 minutes) and heavier isotopes (half-lives in seconds) are fission products in significant quantity, as the other isotopes are shadowed by stable or very long-lived (93Zr) isotopes of the preceding element zirconium from production via beta decay of neutron-rich fission fragments. 95Nb is the decay product of 95Zr (64 days), so disappearance of 95Nb in used nuclear fuel is slower than would be expected from its own 35-day half-life alone. Small amounts of other isotopes may be produced as direct fission products.

List of isotopes 

|-
| rowspan=3|81Nb
| rowspan=3 style="text-align:right" | 41
| rowspan=3 style="text-align:right" | 40
| rowspan=3|80.94903(161)#
| rowspan=3|<44 ns
| β+, p
| 80Y
| rowspan=3|3/2−#
| rowspan=3|
| rowspan=3|
|-
| p
| 80Zr
|-
| β+
| 81Zr
|-
| 82Nb
| style="text-align:right" | 41
| style="text-align:right" | 41
| 81.94313(32)#
| 51(5) ms
| β+
| 82Zr
| 0+
|
|
|-
| 83Nb
| style="text-align:right" | 41
| style="text-align:right" | 42
| 82.93671(34)
| 4.1(3) s
| β+
| 83Zr
| (5/2+)
|
|
|-
| rowspan=2|84Nb
| rowspan=2 style="text-align:right" | 41
| rowspan=2 style="text-align:right" | 43
| rowspan=2|83.93357(32)#
| rowspan=2|9.8(9) s
| β+ (>99.9%)
| 84Zr
| rowspan=2|3+
| rowspan=2|
| rowspan=2|
|-
| β+, p (<.1%)
| 83Y
|-
| style="text-indent:1em" | 84mNb
| colspan="3" style="text-indent:2em" | 338(10) keV
| 103(19) ns
|
|
| (5−)
|
|
|-
| 85Nb
| style="text-align:right" | 41
| style="text-align:right" | 44
| 84.92791(24)
| 20.9(7) s
| β+
| 85Zr
| (9/2+)
|
|
|-
| style="text-indent:1em" | 85mNb
| colspan="3" style="text-indent:2em" | 759.0(10) keV
| 12(5) s
|
|
| (1/2−)
|
|
|-
| 86Nb
| style="text-align:right" | 41
| style="text-align:right" | 45
| 85.92504(9)
| 88(1) s
| β+
| 86Zr
| (6+)
|
|
|-
| style="text-indent:1em" | 86mNb
| colspan="3" style="text-indent:2em" | 250(160)# keV
| 56(8) s
| β+
| 86Zr
| high
|
|
|-
| 87Nb
| style="text-align:right" | 41
| style="text-align:right" | 46
| 86.92036(7)
| 3.75(9) min
| β+
| 87Zr
| (1/2−)
|
|
|-
| style="text-indent:1em" | 87mNb
| colspan="3" style="text-indent:2em" | 3.84(14) keV
| 2.6(1) min
| β+
| 87Zr
| (9/2+)#
|
|
|-
| 88Nb
| style="text-align:right" | 41
| style="text-align:right" | 47
| 87.91833(11)
| 14.55(6) min
| β+
| 88Zr
| (8+)
|
|
|-
| style="text-indent:1em" | 88mNb
| colspan="3" style="text-indent:2em" | 40(140) keV
| 7.8(1) min
| β+
| 88Zr
| (4−)
|
|
|-
| 89Nb
| style="text-align:right" | 41
| style="text-align:right" | 48
| 88.913418(29)
| 2.03(7) h
| β+
| 89Zr
| (9/2+)
|
|
|-
| style="text-indent:1em" | 89mNb
| colspan="3" style="text-indent:2em" | 0(30)# keV
| 1.10(3) h
| β+
| 89Zr
| (1/2)−
|
|
|-
| 90Nb
| style="text-align:right" | 41
| style="text-align:right" | 49
| 89.911265(5)
| 14.60(5) h
| β+
| 90Zr
| 8+
|
|
|-
| style="text-indent:1em" | 90m1Nb
| colspan="3" style="text-indent:2em" | 122.370(22) keV
| 63(2) μs
|
|
| 6+
|
|
|-
| style="text-indent:1em" | 90m2Nb
| colspan="3" style="text-indent:2em" | 124.67(25) keV
| 18.81(6) s
| IT
| 90Nb
| 4-
|
|
|-
| style="text-indent:1em" | 90m3Nb
| colspan="3" style="text-indent:2em" | 171.10(10) keV
| <1 μs
|
|
| 7+
|
|
|-
| style="text-indent:1em" | 90m4Nb
| colspan="3" style="text-indent:2em" | 382.01(25) keV
| 6.19(8) ms
|
|
| 1+
|
|
|-
| style="text-indent:1em" | 90m5Nb
| colspan="3" style="text-indent:2em" | 1880.21(20) keV
| 472(13) ns
|
|
| (11−)
|
|
|-
| rowspan=2|91Nb
| rowspan=2 style="text-align:right" | 41
| rowspan=2 style="text-align:right" | 50
| rowspan=2|90.906996(4)
| rowspan=2|680(130) a
| EC (99.98%)
| 91Zr
| rowspan=2|9/2+
| rowspan=2|
| rowspan=2|
|-
| β+ (.013%)
| 91Zr
|-
| rowspan=3 style="text-indent:1em" | 91m1Nb
| rowspan=3 colspan="3" style="text-indent:2em" | 104.60(5) keV
| rowspan=3|60.86(22) d
| IT (93%)
| 91Nb
| rowspan=3|1/2−
| rowspan=3|
| rowspan=3|
|-
| EC (7%)
| 91Zr
|-
| β+ (.0028%)
| 91Zr
|-
| style="text-indent:1em" | 91m2Nb
| colspan="3" style="text-indent:2em" | 2034.35(19) keV
| 3.76(12) μs
|
|
| (17/2−)
|
|
|-
| rowspan=2|92Nb
| rowspan=2 style="text-align:right" | 41
| rowspan=2 style="text-align:right" | 51
| rowspan=2|91.907194(3)
| rowspan=2|3.47(24)×107 a
| β+ (99.95%)
| 92Zr
| rowspan=2|(7)+
| rowspan=2|
| rowspan=2|
|-
| β− (.05%)
| 92Mo
|-
| style="text-indent:1em" | 92m1Nb
| colspan="3" style="text-indent:2em" | 135.5(4) keV
| 10.15(2) d
| β+
| 92Zr
| (2)+
|
|
|-
| style="text-indent:1em" | 92m2Nb
| colspan="3" style="text-indent:2em" | 225.7(4) keV
| 5.9(2) μs
|
|
| (2)−
|
|
|-
| style="text-indent:1em" | 92m3Nb
| colspan="3" style="text-indent:2em" | 2203.3(4) keV
| 167(4) ns
|
|
| (11−)
|
|
|-
| 93Nb
| style="text-align:right" | 41
| style="text-align:right" | 52
| 92.9063781(26)
| colspan=3 align=center|Stable
| 9/2+
| 1.0000
|
|-
| style="text-indent:1em" | 93mNb
| colspan="3" style="text-indent:2em" | 30.77(2) keV
| 16.13(14) a
| IT
| 93Nb
| 1/2−
|
|
|-
| 94Nb
| style="text-align:right" | 41
| style="text-align:right" | 53
| 93.9072839(26)
| 2.03(16)×104 a
| β−
| 94Mo
| (6)+
|
|
|-
| rowspan=2 style="text-indent:1em" | 94mNb
| rowspan=2 colspan="3" style="text-indent:2em" | 40.902(12) keV
| rowspan=2|6.263(4) min
| IT (99.5%)
| 94Nb
| rowspan=2|3+
| rowspan=2|
| rowspan=2|
|-
| β− (.5%)
| 94Mo
|-
| 95Nb
| style="text-align:right" | 41
| style="text-align:right" | 54
| 94.9068358(21)
| 34.991(6) d
| β−
| 95Mo
| 9/2+
|
|
|-
| rowspan=2 style="text-indent:1em" | 95mNb
| rowspan=2 colspan="3" style="text-indent:2em" | 235.690(20) keV
| rowspan=2|3.61(3) d
| IT (94.4%)
| 95Nb
| rowspan=2|1/2−
| rowspan=2|
| rowspan=2|
|-
| β− (5.6%)
| 95Mo
|-
| 96Nb
| style="text-align:right" | 41
| style="text-align:right" | 55
| 95.908101(4)
| 23.35(5) h
| β−
| 96Mo
| 6+
|
|
|-
| 97Nb
| style="text-align:right" | 41
| style="text-align:right" | 56
| 96.9080986(27)
| 72.1(7) min
| β−
| 97Mo
| 9/2+
|
|
|-
| style="text-indent:1em" | 97mNb
| colspan="3" style="text-indent:2em" | 743.35(3) keV
| 52.7(18) s
| IT
| 97Nb
| 1/2−
|
|
|-
| 98Nb
| style="text-align:right" | 41
| style="text-align:right" | 57
| 97.910328(6)
| 2.86(6) s
| β−
| 98Mo
| 1+
|
|
|-
| rowspan=2 style="text-indent:1em" | 98mNb
| rowspan=2 colspan="3" style="text-indent:2em" | 84(4) keV
| rowspan=2|51.3(4) min
| β− (99.9%)
| 98Mo
| rowspan=2|(5+)
| rowspan=2|
| rowspan=2|
|-
| IT (.1%)
| 98Nb
|-
| 99Nb
| style="text-align:right" | 41
| style="text-align:right" | 58
| 98.911618(14)
| 15.0(2) s
| β−
| 99Mo
| 9/2+
|
|
|-
| rowspan=2 style="text-indent:1em" | 99mNb
| rowspan=2 colspan="3" style="text-indent:2em" | 365.29(14) keV
| rowspan=2|2.6(2) min
| β− (96.2%)
| 99Mo
| rowspan=2|1/2−
| rowspan=2|
| rowspan=2|
|-
| IT (3.8%)
| 99Nb
|-
| 100Nb
| style="text-align:right" | 41
| style="text-align:right" | 59
| 99.914182(28)
| 1.5(2) s
| β−
| 100Mo
| 1+
|
|
|-
| style="text-indent:1em" | 100mNb
| colspan="3" style="text-indent:2em" | 470(40) keV
| 2.99(11) s
| β−
| 100Mo
| (4+, 5+)
|
|
|-
| 101Nb
| style="text-align:right" | 41
| style="text-align:right" | 60
| 100.915252(20)
| 7.1(3) s
| β−
| 101Mo
| (5/2#)+
|
|
|-
| 102Nb
| style="text-align:right" | 41
| style="text-align:right" | 61
| 101.91804(4)
| 1.3(2) s
| β−
| 102Mo
| 1+
|
|
|-
| style="text-indent:1em" | 102mNb
| colspan="3" style="text-indent:2em" | 130(50) keV
| 4.3(4) s
| β−
| 102Mo
| high
|
|
|-
| 103Nb
| style="text-align:right" | 41
| style="text-align:right" | 62
| 102.91914(7)
| 1.5(2) s
| β−
| 103Mo
| (5/2+)
|
|
|-
| rowspan=2|104Nb
| rowspan=2 style="text-align:right" | 41
| rowspan=2 style="text-align:right" | 63
| rowspan=2|103.92246(11)
| rowspan=2|4.9(3) s
| β− (99.94%)
| 104Mo
| rowspan=2|(1+)
| rowspan=2|
| rowspan=2|
|-
| β−, n (.06%)
| 103Mo
|-
| rowspan=2 style="text-indent:1em" | 104mNb
| rowspan=2 colspan="3" style="text-indent:2em" | 220(120) keV
| rowspan=2|940(40) ms
| β− (99.95%)
| 104Mo
| rowspan=2|high
| rowspan=2|
| rowspan=2|
|-
| β−, n (.05%)
| 103Mo
|-
| rowspan=2|105Nb
| rowspan=2 style="text-align:right" | 41
| rowspan=2 style="text-align:right" | 64
| rowspan=2|104.92394(11)
| rowspan=2|2.95(6) s
| β− (98.3%)
| 105Mo
| rowspan=2|(5/2+)#
| rowspan=2|
| rowspan=2|
|-
| β−, n (1.7%)
| 104Mo
|-
| rowspan=2|106Nb
| rowspan=2 style="text-align:right" | 41
| rowspan=2 style="text-align:right" | 65
| rowspan=2|105.92797(21)#
| rowspan=2|920(40) ms
| β− (95.5%)
| 106Mo
| rowspan=2|2+#
| rowspan=2|
| rowspan=2|
|-
| β−, n (4.5%)
| 105Mo
|-
| rowspan=2|107Nb
| rowspan=2 style="text-align:right" | 41
| rowspan=2 style="text-align:right" | 66
| rowspan=2|106.93031(43)#
| rowspan=2|300(9) ms
| β− (94%)
| 107Mo
| rowspan=2|5/2+#
| rowspan=2|
| rowspan=2|
|-
| β−, n (6%)
| 106Mo
|-
| rowspan=2|108Nb
| rowspan=2 style="text-align:right" | 41
| rowspan=2 style="text-align:right" | 67
| rowspan=2|107.93484(32)#
| rowspan=2|0.193(17) s
| β− (93.8%)
| 108Mo
| rowspan=2|(2+)
| rowspan=2|
| rowspan=2|
|-
| β−, n (6.2%)
| 107Mo
|-
| rowspan=2|109Nb
| rowspan=2 style="text-align:right" | 41
| rowspan=2 style="text-align:right" | 68
| rowspan=2|108.93763(54)#
| rowspan=2|190(30) ms
| β− (69%)
| 109Mo
| rowspan=2|5/2+#
| rowspan=2|
| rowspan=2|
|-
| β−, n (69%)
| 108Mo
|-
| rowspan=2|110Nb
| rowspan=2 style="text-align:right" | 41
| rowspan=2 style="text-align:right" | 69
| rowspan=2|109.94244(54)#
| rowspan=2|170(20) ms
| β− (60%)
| 110Mo
| rowspan=2|2+#
| rowspan=2|
| rowspan=2|
|-
| β−, n (40%)
| 109Mo
|- 
| 111Nb
| style="text-align:right" | 41
| style="text-align:right" | 70
| 110.94565(54)#
| 80# ms [>300 ns]
|
|
| 5/2+#
|
|
|-
| 112Nb
| style="text-align:right" | 41
| style="text-align:right" | 71
| 111.95083(75)#
| 60# ms [>300 ns]
|
|
| 2+#
|
|
|-
| 113Nb
| style="text-align:right" | 41
| style="text-align:right" | 72
| 112.95470(86)#
| 30# ms [>300 ns]
|
|
| 5/2+#
|
|
|-
| 114Nb
| style="text-align:right" | 41
| style="text-align:right" | 73
| 
| 
|
|
| 
|
|
|-
| 115Nb
| style="text-align:right" | 41
| style="text-align:right" | 74
| 
| 
|
|
| 
|
|
|-
| 116Nb
| style="text-align:right" | 41
| style="text-align:right" | 75
| 
| 
|
|
| 
|
|
|-
| 117Nb
| style="text-align:right" | 41
| style="text-align:right" | 76
| 
| 
|
|
| 
|
|

Niobium-92
Niobium-92 is an extinct radionuclide with a half-life of 34.7 million years, decaying predominantly via β+ decay. Its abundance relative to the stable 93Nb in the early Solar System, estimated at 1.7×10−5, has been measured to investigate the origin of p-nuclei. A higher initial abundance of 92Nb has been estimated for material in the outer protosolar disk (sampled from the meteorite NWA 6704), suggesting that this nuclide was predominantly formed via the gamma process (photodisintegration) in a nearby core-collapse supernova.

Niobium-92, along with niobium-94, has been detected in refined samples of terrestrial niobium and may originate from bombardment by cosmic ray muons in Earth's crust.

References 

 Isotope masses from:

 Isotopic compositions and standard atomic masses from:

 Half-life, spin, and isomer data selected from the following sources.

 
Niobium
Niobium